Chris Gutierrez (born Christopher Juno Balbin on 9 May 1992) is a Filipino actor.  He is a member of ABS-CBN's Star Magic Batch 13. He is a grandson of two Philippine showbiz greats, Gloria Romero and Juancho Gutierrez.

Biography

Family background
Christopher Gutierrez is a grandson of veteran Filipino actress and former movie queen Gloria Romero.  His grandfather is actor Juancho Gutierrez, another Philippine showbiz veteran actor.  He is the only son of Maritess, a professional chef, the only daughter of Gloria and Juancho.

Chris was born in Delaware, United States on May 9, 1992.  His parents divorced when he was young, and then moved to the Philippines with his mother, leaving behind his dad in Seattle.  They now live together with his grandmother Gloria Romero.

Career
Until the offer from Star Magic came, Chris never considered entering showbiz. He was only 13 when he was contacted by ABS-CBN’s talent management arm.   In 2006, he was launched as a member of Star Magic Batch 13 along with 23 other aspiring actors.

The same year, he made guest appearances in ABS-CBN shows:  Homeboy, Wowowee and ASAP.  He was later cast in ABS-CBN's show, Star Magic Presents: Abt Ur Luv.  He plays role of Rickson a love interest to Giselle, played by Zia Marquez.  This is the start of the Chris-Zia team up.  He and Zia later reprised their respective roles in the follow-up season, Star Magic Presents: Abt Ur Luv Ur Lyf 2.

When Abt Ur Luv ended in 2008. He then starred in the new season of Star Magic Presents, Star Magic Presents: Astigs. The show only went on for two mini-seasons, Astigs in Haay...School Life and Astigs in Luvin' Lyf. In Astigs in Luvin' Lyf, Chris was again paired with Marquez.

Filmography

Notes

References

External links
 Chris Gutierrez Official Forum Site

1992 births
Living people
21st-century Filipino male actors
Filipino male child actors
Filipino male television actors
Filipino television personalities
Filipino people of American descent
Star Magic